Rudolph Herman Behlmer (October 13, 1926 – September 27, 2019) was an American film historian and writer. Born and raised in San Francisco, California, he was an expert in the history and evolution of the motion picture industry.

Biography 
Behlmer began his career with KLAC-TV in Hollywood as a stage manager. At the beginning of the 1960s, Behlmer started researching and writing articles on various aspects of film history. One such project, a career piece on film producer David O. Selznick (Gone with the Wind, Rebecca), led to his book Memo from David O. Selznick (1972). It was followed by nine other books as well as numerous magazine articles and film music recording booklets. Behlmer also contributed to a wide variety of works about the Golden Age of Hollywood. He died on September 27, 2019 at the age of 92.

Audio commentaries
Adventures of Don Juan, with director Vincent Sherman
The Adventures of Robin Hood
The Black Pirate
The Black Swan, with actress Maureen O'Hara
Captain from Castile, with film historians Jon Burlingame and Nick Redman
Casablanca
Chang
Frankenstein
Gone with the Wind
Gunga Din
How the West Was Won, with filmmaker David Strohmaier, director of Cinerama, Inc. John Sittig, music historian Jon Burlingame, and stuntman Loren Janes
The Invisible Man
Laura
Notorious
Singin' in the Rain, with actors Debbie Reynolds, Donald O'Connor, Cyd Charisse, and Kathleen Freeman, co-director Stanley Donen, screenwriters Betty Comden and Adolph Green, and filmmaker Baz Luhrmann
A Streetcar Named Desire, with actor Karl Malden and film historian Jeff Young
Twelve O'Clock High, with film historians Jon Burlingame and Nick Redman
20,000 Leagues Under the Sea, with director Richard Fleischer
Yankee Doodle Dandy

References

External links
 
 Rudy Behlmer papers, Margaret Herrick Library, Academy of Motion Picture Arts and Sciences

1926 births
2019 deaths
American film historians
American male non-fiction writers
Writers from San Francisco
20th-century American historians
21st-century American historians
21st-century American male writers
20th-century American male writers
Historians from California